London International Financial Futures and Options Exchange
University of London International Programmes
London International Airport
London Clubs International
London International Awards
London International, a subsidiary label of London Records